Slowing Down the World is the third studio album by trumpet player Chris Botti. It was released by GRP Records on June 22, 1999. Botti himself provided vocals on "Same Girl".

Track listing

Personnel 

 Chris Botti – trumpet (1-11), keyboards (1, 3, 4, 6, 7), arrangements (4), drum programming (7), vocals (9)
 Harvey Jones – keyboards (1-8), acoustic piano (6)
 Jeff Lorber – acoustic piano (1), electric piano (1, 3, 7, 10)
 Jeff Young – acoustic piano (3), electric piano (3, 4, 8)
 Bob James – electric piano (5)
 C. J. Vanston – keyboards (9)
 Shane Fontayne – guitar (1, 8, 10)
 Tim Pierce – guitar (1-5, 7), acoustic guitar (6)
 Marc Shulman – guitar (1, 7)
 Dean Parks – acoustic guitar (6)
 Greg Leisz – pedal steel guitar (6, 10)
 John Ossman – bass (1, 3, 7)
 Armand Sabal Lecco – piccolo bass (2)
 Tony Levin – bass (2)
 Nathan East – bass (4, 5, 8)
 Larry Klein – bass (6, 10)
 Garry Hughes – drum programming (1, 4, 5), keyboards (8)
 John Robinson – drums (1, 3–7)
 Peter Erskine – drums (2, 4, 8, 10)
 Shawn Pelton – hi-hat (1)
 Alex Acuña – percussion (1, 2, 3, 5, 6, 8)
 Joe Bonadio – percussion (4)
 Jerry Marotta – percussion (4)
 Michael Davis – trombone (3)
 Anne Dudley – string arrangements (1, 2, 3, 5, 11), orchestra conductor (1-5, 11)
 Rob Mathes – arrangements (4)
 Gavyn Wright – concertmaster (1-5, 11)
 The London Session Orchestra – orchestra (1-5, 11)
 Jonatha Brooke – vocals (2)
 Sting – vocals (4)

Production 
 Chris Botti – producer (1-8, 11), mixing (9), liner notes 
 Eric Calvi – co-producer (1-8, 11)
 Harvey Jones – producer (1-8, 11)
 Andy Snitzer – producer (1-8, 11)
 Bobby Colomby – producer (9), mixing (9)
 Larry Klein – producer (10)
 Chris Roberts – executive producer 
 Marc Silag – executive producer 
 Dan Marnien – engineer
 Greg Burns – assistant engineer
 Walter Clisson – assistant engineer
 David Cole – assistant engineer
 Andy Haller – assistant engineer
 Larry Hirsch – assistant engineer
 Tom Jenkins – assistant engineer
 Simon Osborne – assistant engineer
 Steve Price – assistant engineer
 Ray Pyle – assistant engineer
 Andy Smith – assistant engineer
 Mike Shipley – mixing (1-8, 10, 11)
 Steve Hall – mastering at Future Disc (North Hollywood, California).
 Hollis King – art direction, design
 Rocky Schenck – photography

Charts

References

Chris Botti albums
1999 albums
Albums produced by Larry Klein
Albums produced by Bobby Colomby
GRP Records albums
Instrumental albums